Eric Winter (15 May 1905 – 1981) was a children's illustrator, most notable for his contributions to Ladybird books. Before his work for Ladybird Books, he worked on commission, producing work for Eagle, Swift and Girl magazines.

Biography 

Eric Winter was born in Edmonton, North London on 15 May 1905. 

He was educated at Latymer School, where he first became interested in art. He later studied at Hornsey Art School where he specialized in commercial and fine art and charcoal. He painted in both water colours and oils, but preferred the use of water colours.
 
In order to provide for his family Eric took up commercial art and in the 1950s he was commissioned by Abbey National Building Society to design their logo, which became their famous trademark of two people sheltering under the roof of a house. 

Eric Winter appeared in Artists Who's Who between 1960 and 1970 and is known for a painting called the 'Spinning Jenny' which he was commissioned to do, in oils, for the International Wool Secretariat in London.

Several of his water colours were hung in the Royal Academy of Arts.

Over his working life he was commissioned to illustrate various magazines – Woman's Own, Woman, The Girl. He was commissioned by Reverend Chad Varah to draw religious illustrations for his children's Bible stories in Swift and by Reverend Marcus Morris to do religious illustrations for the Eagle comic.

Family 
Eric Winter had an older brother and a younger sister. His brother Francis became Head of the Teacher Training course at Hornsey Art School and became one of the foremost wood engravers in the country.

Eric Winter died in 1981 and is survived by his wife, daughter and son.

References 

1905 births
1981 deaths
People from Edmonton, London
People educated at The Latymer School
Artists from London
British painters
British male painters
British illustrators
British children's book illustrators
20th-century illustrators of fairy tales